The following is the list of squads that took part in the men's water polo tournament at the 1952 Summer Olympics.

CF=Centre Forward
CB=Centre Back
D=Defender
GK=Goalkeeper

Argentina
Argentina entered a squad of ten players. They scored six goals but only three scorers are known.

Head coach:

Australia
Australia entered a squad of ten players. They scored two goals but all scorers are unknown.

Head coach:

Austria
Austria entered a squad of eleven players. They scored fourteen goals but all scorers are unknown.

Head coach:

Belgium
Belgium entered an unknown number of players ten of them are known. They scored 27 goals but only two scorers are known.

Head coach:

Brazil
The following players represented Brazil.

 Claudino Castro
 Márvio dos Santos
 Lucio Figueirêdo
 João Havelange
 Douglas Lima
 Henrique Melmann
 Edson Peri
 Sérgio Rodrígues
 Leo Rossi
 Samuel Schemberg
 Daniel Sili

Egypt
The following players represented Egypt.

 Ahmed Fouad Nessim
 Jack Hakim
 Samir Gharbo
 Taha El-Gamal
 Omar Sabry
 Abdel Aziz Khalifa
 Abdel Aziz El-Shafei
 Dorri Abdel Kader
 Galal El-Din Abdel Meguid Abou El-Kheir
 Salah El-Din El-Sahrawi

Germany
The following players represented Germany.

 Günter Heine
 Paul Uellendahl
 Erich Sauermann
 Wilfried Bode
 Willi Sturm
 Heinz Zander
 Ferdinand Panke
 Emil Bildstein
 Philipp Dotzer

Great Britain
The following players represented Great Britain.

 Ian Johnson
 Charles Brand
 Jack Jones
 Gerry Worsell
 Ron Turner
 Terry Miller
 Jack Fergusson
 David Murray
 Stan Hawkins

Hungary
Hungary entered a squad of 13 players. They scored 53 goals.

Head coach:

India
The following players represented India.

 Birendra Basak
 David Sopher
 Kedar Shah
 Isaac Mansoor
 Sambhu Saha
 Sachin Nag
 Khamlillal Shah
 Bijoy Barman
 Jehangir Naegamwalla
 Ran Chandnani

Italy
Italy entered a squad of eleven players. They scored 43 goals but all scorers are unknown.

Head coach: Giulio De Filippis and Mario Majoni

Mexico
The following players represented Mexico.

 Juan Trejo
 Arturo Coste
 Manuel Castro
 José Olguín
 Otilio Olguín
 Modesto Martínez

Netherlands
The Netherlands entered an unknown number of players only seven of them are known. They scored 43 goals only 38 scorers are unknown.

Head coach: Frans Kuyper

Portugal
Portugal entered a squad of ten players. They scored two goals but both are unknown.

Head coach:

Romania
The following players represented Romania.

 Zoltan Norman
 Atila Kelemen
 Adalbert Iordache
 Gavrila Törok
 Zoltan Hospodar
 Octavian Iosim
 Francisc Şimon
 Arcadie Sarcadi

South Africa
The following players represented South Africa.

 William Aucamp
 Ron Meredith
 Gerald Goddard
 Douglas Melville
 Johnnie van Gent
 Des Cohen
 Solly Yach
 Dennis Pappas

Soviet Union
The Soviet Union entered a squad of 13 players. They scored 38 goals but only four scorers are known.

Head coach: Vadim Kuznetsov and Ivan Dmitriev

Spain
The following players represented Spain.

 Leandro Ribera Abad
 Ricardo Conde
 Josep Bazán
 Roberto Queralt
 Antonio Subirana
 Agustín Mestres
 Juan Abellán
 Francisco Castillo

Sweden
The following players represented Sweden.

 Rune Källqvist
 Erik Holm
 Roland Spångberg
 Stig Johansson
 Arne Jutner
 Hans Hellbrand
 Åke Julin
 Bo Larsson

United States
The United States entered a squad of eleven players. They scored 35 goals but only 19 scorers are known.

Head coach: Urho Saari (coach); John Curran (manager)

Yugoslavia
Yugoslavia entered a squad of eleven players. They scored 44 goals but only four scorers are known.

Head coach:

References

External links
 Olympic Report
 

1952 Summer Olympics